CyberStrike is a futuristic 3D combat online game by Simutronics, involving team combat between customizable mechs, each of which is controlled by a different player.

Initially exclusive to the GEnie online service, it opened in February 1993, and later that year it caused Computer Gaming World to create the new category of "Online Game of the Year" so it could be awarded to CyberStrike. In 1994, it was offered in stores by MicroProse.

In 1997, a sequel, Cyberstrike 2, was announced as a joint project between Simutronics and Sony's 989 Studios.  A single-player mission-based version was released in stores, and a multiplayer version opened on GEnie in December 1998.  It was also released on America Online, and then via the Simutronics website.  After Cyberstrike 2 opened, the original version of the game was renamed as CyberStrike Classic.

Reception
Computer Gaming World in 1993 praised the simple user interface and "amazing" graphics, including the weather. The reviewer reported that he played 12 hours before stopping at $6 an hour, concluding that "CyberStrike is addictive, action-filled and downright fun. The violence is bloodless ... but the challenge is exhilarating". That year the magazine named CyberStrike the On-Line Game of the Year. A 1994 survey of strategic space games set in the year 2000 and later gave the game four stars out of five, stating that it was "very competitive in a multi-player environment but lacks the long-term rationale of Multiplayer BattleTech".

References

External links
 CyberStrike website at Simutronics

1994 video games
DOS games
DOS-only games
MicroProse games
Multiplayer online games
Vehicle simulation games
Video games about mecha
Video games developed in the United States